Villanova d'Albenga is a comune (municipality) in the Province of Savona in the Italian region Liguria, located about  southwest of Genoa and about  southwest of Savona.

Villanova d'Albenga borders the following municipalities: Alassio, Albenga, Andora, Casanova Lerrone, Garlenda, and Ortovero.

References

Cities and towns in Liguria